Red Maple Farm, also known as Gulick House, is a historic house and bed and breakfast located on Raymond Road west of the Monmouth Junction section of South Brunswick in Middlesex County, New Jersey. It was added to the National Register of Historic Places on July 3, 1979, for its significance in agriculture and architecture. In addition to the main house, a smoke house and barn contribute to the property.

History and description
The house was built in 1740 by Joachim Gulick whose family ran a stage line. It is situated on what was the King's Highway, nearby Kingston between Princeton and New Brunswick. The house was a stop on the Underground Railroad. It remained in the Gulick family until 1901. After that the property had several owners and was subsequently subdivided.

See also
 List of Underground Railroad sites
 List of the oldest buildings in New Jersey
 National Register of Historic Places listings in Middlesex County, New Jersey

References 

South Brunswick, New Jersey
Houses on the National Register of Historic Places in New Jersey
Houses in Middlesex County, New Jersey
Hotels in New Jersey
Houses on the Underground Railroad
Hotel buildings on the National Register of Historic Places in New Jersey
National Register of Historic Places in Middlesex County, New Jersey
Bed and breakfasts in New Jersey
New Jersey Register of Historic Places